Parambrata Chattopadhyay (born 27 June 1980) is an Indian actor and director. Parambrata started his career with Bengali television and films. He has acted as the fictional character Topshe from Feluda under Sandip Ray's direction. He made his Hindi debut in Kahaani (2012), starring with Vidya Balan and Nawazuddin Siddiqui. His notable works include Bhalo Theko (2003), Baishe Srabon (2011), Sold (2014) directed by Jeffrey D. Brown,   
Kadambari  (2017),  Anukul (2017),  Pari (2018), Ramprasad Ki Tehrvi (2019), Dwitiyo Purush(2020), Bulbbul (2020) .

Personal life 

Parambrata was born in Kolkata, in the state of West Bengal, India, to parents who worked as film critics. He is the son of Satinath Chatterjee and Sunetra Ghatak, maternal grandson of Ashish Chandra Ghatak and Gita Ghatak, and grandnephew of filmmaker Ritwik Ghatak. Bengali author and activist Mahasweta Devi is Parambrata's aunt.
He has often been targeted by fundamentalists for his secularist views. He was previously in a relationship with actress Swastika Mukherjee. He has been in a relationship with Ike Schouten, a doctor from The Netherlands, for nearly a decade. Parambrata studied at Patha Bhavan school in Kolkata.

Career 

Chatterjee has acted in many television series, tele-films, short films and films. His directorial debut feature film is Jiyo Kaka (2011) starring Rituparna Sengupta and Rudranil Ghosh. His second directorial venture was Hawa Bodol (2013). Seven months after the success of Kahaani, he was signed by Jeffrey D. Brown, who won an Academy Award for his debut short film in 1986, for his film Sold.

On 30 May 2011, he became a producer along with colleague, Rudranil Ghosh, by launching their own production house, Workshop Productions Pvt. Ltd, in association with Dipak Raha of Durgandh Group.

Filmography

References

External links 

 

|-
! colspan="3" style="background: #DAA520;" | BFJA Awards
|-

|-

Indian male film actors
Living people
Bengali male actors
Bengali Hindus
Male actors in Bengali cinema
Male actors from Kolkata
21st-century Indian male actors
1980 births
Indian film directors
Film directors from Kolkata
21st-century Indian film directors